David Ruchien Liu (born 1973) is an American chemist and biologist. He is the Richard Merkin Professor, Director of the Merkin Institute of Transformative Technologies in Healthcare, and Vice-Chair of the Faculty at the Broad Institute of Harvard and MIT; Thomas Dudley Cabot Professor of the Natural Sciences and Professor of Chemistry and Chemical Biology at Harvard University; and Howard Hughes Medical Institute Investigator.

Early life and education
Liu was born in Riverside, California on June 12, 1973. Both his parents immigrated to the United States from Taiwan. His father is an aerospace engineer; his mother is a retired physics professor at the University of California, Riverside.  While in high school, he finished second in the 1990 national Westinghouse Science Talent Search. He received his A.B. in chemistry from Harvard University in 1994, graduating summa cum laude and first in his class. While an undergraduate, he worked in the synthetic chemistry laboratory of Nobel Laureate E.J. Corey. Liu received his Ph.D. in organic chemistry from the University of California, Berkeley in 1999, supervised by Peter G. Schultz.

Academic career
Liu graduated first in his class at Harvard in 1994. He performed organic and bioorganic chemistry research on sterol biosynthesis under Professor E. J. Corey's guidance as an undergraduate. During his Ph.D. research with Professor Peter Schultz at Berkeley, Liu initiated the first general effort to expand the genetic code in living cells. He earned his Ph.D. in 1999 and became assistant professor of chemistry and chemical biology at Harvard in the same year. He was promoted to associate professor in 2003 and to full professor in 2005. Liu became a Howard Hughes Medical Investigator in 2005 and joined the JASONs, academic science advisors to the U.S. government, in 2009. He was honored as a Harvard College Professor in 2007, in part for his undergraduate teaching. His introductory life sciences course, beginning in 2005, became Harvard's largest natural sciences course.

Liu has earned several university-wide distinctions for teaching at Harvard, including the Joseph R. Levenson Memorial Teaching Prize, the Roslyn Abramson Award, and a Harvard College Professorship. Liu has published more than 225 papers and is the inventor of more than 90 issued U.S. patents. His research accomplishments have earned distinctions including the Ronald Breslow Award for Biomimetic Chemistry, the American Chemical Society Pure Chemistry Award, the Arthur C. Cope Young Scholar Award, and awards from the Sloan Foundation, Beckman Foundation, NSF CAREER Program, and Searle Scholars Program. In 2016, he was named one of the Top 20 Translational Researchers in the world by Nature Biotechnology, and in 2017 and 2019 was named to the Nature’s 10 researchers in world and to the Foreign Policy Leading Global Thinkers. In April 2019, Liu delivered a TED talk on base editing in Vancouver at TED2019, resulting in a standing ovation from the live audience.  In 2019, prime editing was named as one of Nature's 10 remarkable papers from 2019 and one of The Scientist's top technical advances. In 2020, Liu earned the American Chemical Society David Perlman Award and the American Chemical Society ACS Chemical Biology Lectureship Award, was elected to the National Academy of Science (NAS), the National Academy of Medicine (NAM) and was named as a Fellow of the American Association for the Advancement of Science (AAAS). In 2022, he was awarded the King Faisal Prize in Medicine.

Research
Liu's research group pioneered base editing, a new method of genome editing that enables the direct and precise conversion of a single base to another base in the genome of living cells, without making DNA double-stranded breaks (DSBs) that lead to complex mixtures of insertions, deletions, and DNA rearrangements. Liu's research group also pioneered prime editing, a versatile genome editing method that can install all possible base-to-base conversions, insertions, deletions, and combinations in mammalian cells without requiring double-strand DNA breaks or donor DNA templates.  Additionally, Liu's group developed DNA-templated synthesis (DTS), a technique to translate DNA sequences into synthetic small molecules, rather than proteins, and applied DTS to the discovery of bioactive small molecules and new chemical reactions. His lab also developed phage-assisted continuous evolution (PACE), a technique that uses the short 10-minute lifespan of M13 bacteriophage to achieve the rapid evolution of useful proteins. The lab has used PACE and its directed evolution efforts to generate new genome editing tools that allow for expanded DNA accessibility and DNA base conversions.

He has an h-index of 122 according to Google Scholar.

Commercial activity
Liu co-founded Editas Medicine (genome editing with CRISPR nucleases for human therapeutics), Pairwise Plants (genome editing for agriculture), Beam Therapeutics (base editing for human therapeutics), Exo Therapeutics (novel small-molecule drug discovery), Chroma Medicine (genomic medicines that harness epigenetics), Resonance Medicine (novel enzymatic solutions for unment challenges in medicine), and Nvelop Therapeutics (novel gene editing delivery technologies). He is the scientific founder of Prime Medicine (prime editing for human therapeutics). 

Liu also founded Permeon Biologics and Ensemble Therapeutics. Permeon Biologics was founded in 2011 by Liu and Flagship Ventures to develop a class of proteins to enable the transport of large molecules such as antibodies into cells to facilitate development of "intrabody" therapeutics and ceased its operations in 2015. Ensemble Therapeutics was founded in 2004 with funding from Flagship Ventures to develop Liu's work on macrocycles; the company raised about $40M and struck several pharmaceutical partnerships, but was shut down in 2017 before any of its lead compounds had reached the market.

Selected papers

Maianti, J. P.; McFedries, A.; Foda, Z. H.; Kleiner, R. E.; Du, X.-Q.; Leissring, M. A.; Tang, W.-J.; Charron, M. J.; Seeliger, M. A.; Saghatelian, A.; Liu, D. R. Nature 511, 94-98 (2014). “Anti-Diabetic Activity of Insulin-Degrading Enzyme Inhibitors Mediated by Multiple Hormones” PMC4142213
Anzalone, A.V.; Randolph, P.B.; Davis, J.R.; Sousa, A.A.; Koblan, L.W.; Levy, J.M.; Chen, P.J.; Wilson, C.; Newby, G.A.; Raguram, A.; Liu, D.R. Nature,  576, 149–157 (2019). “Search-and-replace genome editing without double-strand breaks or donor DNA.”  PMCID: PMC6907074 
Mok, B. Y; de Moraes, M. H; Zeng, J; Bosch, D. E; Kotrys, A. V; Raguram, A.; Hsu, F; Radey, M.C; Broko Peterson, B; Mootha, V.K; Mougous, J.D;  Liu, D. R. Nature. available online (2020). "An interbacterial cytidine deaminase toxin enables mitochondrial base editing." PMCID: PMC7381381

See also
 DNA‐Templated Organic Synthesis

References

Living people
1973 births
21st-century American chemists
American people of Taiwanese descent
Harvard University faculty
Harvard University alumni
Howard Hughes Medical Investigators
UC Berkeley College of Chemistry alumni
Members of the United States National Academy of Sciences
Members of JASON (advisory group)
People from Riverside, California
Scientists from California
Members of the National Academy of Medicine